The Redshift is the fourth album from the Finnish melodic death metal band Omnium Gatherum. It is the band's second release for the Candlelight Records label. The album features a number of creative aspects not yet attempted by the band.

A music video for the single 'Nail' was released in Autumn 2008.

The album placed 24th in the Finnish heavy metal charts during 2008.

Track listing
All lyrics written by Jukka Pelkonen.

References

External links 
The RedShift at MySpace
The RedShift at OmniumGatherum.org
The RedShift at MetalFromFinland.com

Omnium Gatherum albums
2008 albums